The Hupobi is a Tewa Pueblo ancestral site in an address-restricted area of Abiquiú, New Mexico, United States. It was occupied from around 1350 until around 1550.  In 1985, it was listed on the National Register of Historic Places listings in Rio Arriba County, New Mexico.

References

Archaeological sites on the National Register of Historic Places in New Mexico
Former populated places in New Mexico
Native American history of New Mexico
Protected areas of Rio Arriba County, New Mexico
Pueblo great houses
Puebloan buildings and structures
Ruins in the United States
Tewa
National Register of Historic Places in Rio Arriba County, New Mexico
Pueblos on the National Register of Historic Places in New Mexico